Hayatabad may refer to:

 Hayatabad township is a suburb of Peshawar, Pakistan
 Hayatabad village or hamlet, sometimes also called 'Kot Hayat', near Sheikhupura, Pakistan, named after Nawab Muhammad Hayat Khan, CSI.

Hayatabad may also refer to:

 Hayatabad-e Khalifeh, Iran
 Hayatabad-e Majidi, Iran
 Heyatabad (disambiguation)